OFK Bačka are a Serbian football club based in Bačka Palanka. The 2020-21 campaign will be the club's 75th season since the club were formed. During this season the club will have competed in the following competitions: Serbian SuperLiga, Serbian Cup.

Players

Current squad

Players with multiple nationalities 
   Nikola Eskić
   Danilo Radjen

Transfers

Competitions

Club Friendlies

Serbian Super Liga

Results summary

Results by round

Matches

Serbian Cup

Squad statistics

Goalscorers

References

External links
 Official website
 FK Bačka Forum
 FK Bačka at Srbijasport.net

Backa